{{Infobox religious building
| name               = Funerary complex of Sultan al-Ashraf Qaytbay
| image              = Qaytbay complex.jpg
| image_upright   =
| alt                =
| caption            = Sultan Qaytbay's mosque and mausoleum complex
| coordinates        = 
| map_type        = Egypt
| map_caption        = Location in Egypt
| location           = Northern Cemetery, Cairo, Egypt
| year_completed     = 1474
|religious_affiliation=Islam
| patron             = Sultan al-Ashraf Abu al-Nasr Qaytbay
| imam               =
| specifications     =
| architect          =
| architecture_type  = mausoleum, madrasa, mosque, maq'ad, sabil, kuttab, hod (water trough), ''rab (apartment complex)
| architecture_style = late Mamluk
| capacity           =
| length             =
| width              =
| totalarea          =
| height             =
| dome_quantity      = 2
| dome_height_outer  =
| dome_height_inner  =
| dome_dia_outer     =
| dome_dia_inner     =
| minaret_quantity   = 1
| minaret_height     =
| materials          =
| renovations        =
| website            =
| footnotes          =
}}

The funerary complex of Sultan Qaytbay is an architectural complex built by Sultan al-Ashraf Qaytbay in Cairo's Northern Cemetery, completed in 1474. It is often considered one of the most beautiful and accomplished monuments of late Egyptian Mamluk architecture, and is pictured on the Egyptian one pound note.

 Historical background 

 Sultan Qaytbay and his reign 
Al-Ashraf Qaytbay was a mamluk purchased by Sultan al-Ashraf Barsbay (ruled 1422–1438) and served under several Mamluk sultans, the last of whom – Sultan al-Zahir Timurbugha (ruled 1467-1468) – appointed him amir al-kabir, the commander-in-chief or highest position for an amir under the sultan. Qaytbay succeeded Timurbugha as sultan at the age of 54, and ruled for nearly 29 years from 1468 to 1496, the second-longest reign of any Egyptian Mamluk sultan (after al-Nasir Muhammad). His period was marked by external threats and internal rebellions, notably from the rising Ottomans, which required costly military expeditions, as well as by financial problems. Nonetheless, he is also known as an effective ruler who brought long-term stability while he remained in power, and he is especially notable as one of the greatest patrons of architecture in the Mamluk period, and particularly of the Burji Mamluk period which was otherwise marked by Egypt's relative decline. He is known for at least 85 structures which he built or restored in Egypt, Syria, Palestine, and Mecca, including 17 in Cairo, and this period is characterized by a refinement of the Mamluk architectural style which included greater decorative detail.

 Construction and context 
Qaytbay's funerary complex was one of his earliest architectural commissions; construction work for the complex began in 1470 and the mausoleum was completed in 1474. The construction period was long by Mamluk standards; however, Qaytbay's complex was on a large scale and constituted an entire royal quarter or walled suburb in the then-lightly urbanized desert cemetery area east of Cairo – now known as the Northern Cemetery. This desert area was developed by the Burji Mamluks in the 15th century as the main southern Qarafa necropolis, not to mention the main city itself, became too full for major new monuments. Major construction projects like Qaytbay's may have been aimed in part at urbanizing this spacious area at the time, though eventually it became mostly an extension of the city's vast cemeteries. Its religious and commercial establishments took advantage of a caravan route which ran through it from Cairo to Mecca in the east and to Syria in the north.  Qaytbay's large complex, like others built by Mamluk amirs and sultans, combined various charitable and commercial functions, which might have contributed to his family's financial future after his death.

Qaytbay's mausoleum and complex was also built close to the shrine of the Muslim mystic 'Abd Allah al-Manafi, over whose tomb Qaytbay built a new dome in 1474. This may have influenced his decision to appoint a shaykh of the Maliki madhhab to his mosque, which was unusual for Mamluk institutions.

 Description 

 Overview 
Qaytbay's complex contained numerous buildings over a relatively vast area, enclosed by the same wall, of which one gate, Bab al-Gindi, still remains to the south of the mausoleum. Many of the original structures which once faced each other on both sides of the existing street have vanished. What remains today is the mosque, which is attached to the mausoleum of Qaytbay himself, as well as a maq'ad (loggia), a smaller mosque and mausoleum for Qaytbay's sons, a hod (drinking trough for animals), and a rab''' (an apartment complex where tenants paid rent). At one point it was also described to have had large gardens.
The mosque/madrasa
The mosque (originally a madrasa), along with the mausoleum of the sultan, forms the main building of the complex and is considered exceptional for its refined proportions and the subdued yet exquisite decorations. The mosque's entrance faces north and diverts the main road slightly eastwards around the walls of the mausoleum, possibly to enhance its visual effect. The façade features ablaq stonework (alternating dark and light stone) and the entrance portal is enhanced by a high elaborate groin-vaulted recess with muqarnas squinches. The minaret stands above the entrance on the western side and is exquisitely carved in stone, divided into three stories with elaborately carved balconies. The eastern corner of the façade is occupied by a sabil (from which water could be dispensed to passers-by) on the ground floor and by a kuttab (school) on the top floor. The former is marked by large windows with iron grilles, while the later is marked by a loggia with open arches on two sides. 

Inside, the vestibule features another ornate groin-vault ceiling and leads to the main sanctuary hall which follows a modified layout of the classic madrasa, with two large iwans on the qibla axis and two shallow or reduced iwans to the sides. The hall is richly decorated in stone-carving, painted wooden ceilings and coloured windows. The mihrab is relatively modest but the wooden minbar is richly carved with geometric patterns and inlaid with ivory and mother-of-pearl. The wooden lantern ceiling above the central space is notable for its carving and painted pattern but is a restoration work by the "Comité" and not the original. The central floor also features elaborate polychrome patterned marble but is usually covered by carpets.

 The mausoleum and dome 
Qaytbay's mausoleum projects from the eastern side of the building, which makes the dome more visible from the street and allows for more light to reach the interior through the northern-facing windows. The outer dome of the mausoleum demonstrates an evolution from the stone domes built earlier and nearby by Sultan Barsbay and others: it is often cited as the apogee of Mamluk dome design in Cairo due to its complex stone-carved decorative pattern. This pattern features a central geometric star radiating from the apex of the dome and an arabesque floral design which are superimposed and enhanced by natural shadows. 

On the inside, the mausoleum chamber is reached from a door next to the qibla wall. It is decorated with a carved and ablaq mihrab, polychrome marble paneling, and a high dome with muqarnas pendentives. It contains the sultan's tomb as well as an alleged footprint of the Prophet Muhammad brought from Mecca.

Auxiliary structures
To the west of Qaytbay's main mosque is a smaller domed tomb which may have been built earlier when Qaytbay was only an amir, but was later dedicated to his sons. It was later used by a Turkish Sufi named Gulshani during the Ottoman period. The small dome is decorated on the outside in a stone-carved pattern similar to that of the sultan's mausoleum but slightly simpler. The tomb is attached to a building which seems to have been part of the royal residential complex which Qaytbay built. Just west of this is a maq'ad, which usually denotes a loggia overlooking a courtyard but in this case is an enclosed hall with many windows, located over storage rooms.

Just to the north of the mosque, on the main street, is a hod or drinking trough for animals, with shallow decorative niches along its wall. Further north are the semi-ruined remains of a rab or apartment complex on the west side of the main street. It is partially buried below street level but its high vaulted entrance portal is still visible.

Modern-day use and restoration 
For the past few years, the Cairo-based ARCHiNOS Architecture has been conserving monuments within the funerary complex of Sultan al-Ashraf Qaitbey. The work is primarily financed by the European Union and done under the auspices of the Historic Cairo Project within the Egyptian Ministry of Antiquities. ARCHiNOS has increasingly included social development and cultural components in its work, and has adapted the reception hall in the Sultan's onetime residence (maq‘ad) for a hub of art and culture in the neighbourhood. ARCHiNOS also upgraded the small urban square in front of the building to make it a fitting setting for various cultural events organised in and around the maq‘ad of Sultan Qaitbey. In 2016, the not-for-profit Sultan Foundation has been established to provide access to culture in the underprivileged neighbourhood and to promote links between preservation of cultural heritage and social and economic development.

See also
 Khanqah-Mausoleum of Sultan Barsbay
 Mosque of Qaytbay (Qal'at al-Kabsh)
 Lists of mosques
 List of mosques in Africa
 List of mosques in Egypt

References

External links

 3D Virtual Tours - spherical view of the interior of Qaytbay's mosque.
 3D Virtual Tours - spherical view of the interior of Qaytbay's tomb chamber.
 Discover Islamic Art - information and pictures on Qaytbay's mosque/madrasa, including floor plan.
 Dobrowolska Agnieszka/Dobrowolski, Jaroslaw: More than Stones: Heritage for the Living in Cairo's 'City of the Dead', 2018

Qaitbay
Mamluk architecture in Egypt
Mosque buildings with domes
Mosques in Cairo
Mausoleums in Egypt
Mosques completed in 1474
15th-century establishments in the Mamluk Sultanate